Bończa is a Polish coat of arms.

Notable bearers
Notable bearers of this coat of arms include:

House of Badeni
Stanisław Chomętowski
Stefan Chmielecki
House of Fredro
Aleksander Fredro
Józef Ignacy Dyga Polish National Army, victim of Russian massacre at Katyń
Stanisław Jakub Skarżyński Group Captain Polish Air Force, record holder transatlantic flight 1933
Ambroży Mikołaj Skarżyński Baron, General, Chief of Napoleon's Imperial Guard squadron (Polish 1st Light Cavalry Regiment of the Imperial Guard).

Related coat of arms
 Chłędowski coat of arms
  coat of arms

Gallery

See also

 Polish heraldry
 Heraldic family
 List of coats of arms of Polish nobility

Bibliography
 Tadeusz Gajl: Herbarz polski od średniowiecza do XX wieku : ponad 4500 herbów szlacheckich 37 tysięcy nazwisk 55 tysięcy rodów. L&L, 2007. .
 Sławomir Górzyński: Arystokracja polska w Galicji: studium heraldyczno-genealogiczne. Warszawa: DiG, 2009, s. 85-87. .

External links
 https://web.archive.org/web/20070714033407/http://www.ornatowski.com/index/herbyszlacheckie.htm
 http://gajl.wielcy.pl/herby_lista.php?startp=0&herbcnt=1&lang=pl&query=8Boncza*&submit=Wy%C5%9Bwietl+Herby

Polish coats of arms